Deh Pish-e Olya (also Romanized as Deh Pīsh-e ‘Olyā; also known as Deh-e Pīsh Bālā, Deh-e Pīsh-e Bālā, and Deh Pīsh-e Bālā) is a village in Eslamabad Rural District, in the Central District of Jiroft County, Kerman Province, Iran. At the 2006 census, its population was 583, in 110 families.

References 

Populated places in Jiroft County